Cuciulat Cave is located on the Podișul Someșan plateau, near the village Cuciulat in the commune Letca, Sălaj County, Romania. It contains the oldest known cave paintings in Central Europe.

The cave has been known to locals long before World War I, after which it was partially destroyed due to limestone quarrying that included the use of explosives. On 28 July 1978, a team of speleologists (A. Done, F. Cucu, T. Vadeanu, M. Codrescu, Simona Manolescu) from the Emil Racoviță Speleologic Club explored the cave, noticing the existence of cave rock paintings in one of the caverns.

The following spring archeologist Marin Cârciumaru accompanied by two team members launched the scientific research. A chemical analysis established that the paintings were executed with red clay rich in iron oxides (13% Fe2O3).

Marin Cârciumaru, according to analogies in Europe, estimated that the Cuciulat cave paintings were completed during the Upper Paleolithic, about 12,000 years ago. This dating could not be supported by other evidence of archaeological nature. A significant part of the cave had been already destroyed by quarrying, including possible traces of a human habitation in the cave or in its immediate vicinity. It compromised the chances to discover artifacts that would provide additional clues for the dating of the paintings.

The individual images are silhouettes with neither outlines nor any shading.

In 1985 the entrance of the cave became inaccessible due to a landslide inside the former quarry area. In this context, the present condition of the cave paintings is not known.

The interest for the Cuciulat cave and its cave paintings has been recently revived. A new research and excavation campaign is under discussion on the basis of contemporary techniques and dating methods, that might also allow eventual identification of drawings that were possibly omitted during the 1979 campaign.

References

External links
 Romanian Cave May Boast Central Europe's Oldest Cave Art
 Coliboaia Cave Art (30,000 BCE)

Caves of Romania
Limestone caves
Rock art in Europe
Archaeological sites in Romania